Coleophora absinthivora is a moth of the family Coleophoridae. It is found in France and Spain.

The larvae feed on Artemisia absinthium. They mine the leaves of their host plant.

References

absinthivora
Moths described in 1990
Moths of Europe